The Tumansky R-15 is an axial flow, single shaft turbojet with an afterburner. Its best known use is on the Mikoyan-Gurevich MiG-25.

Design and development
The R-15-300 was designed at the OKB-300 design bureau led by Sergei Tumansky in the late 1950s. The engine was originally intended for the Tupolev Tu-121 high-altitude high-speed cruise missile. Due to a lack of Soviet resources and funding the engine casing was mainly steel, and in areas exposed to high temperatures, 30 micrometre silver-plated steel. At the time, the USSR did not have the resources to exploit metals such as titanium or other alloys which could have reduced the weight of the engine. The Tu-121 was later canceled, but its basic design was used in the Tupolev Tu-123 reconnaissance drone.

Performance
The maximum thrust was 7,500 kilograms force (73.5 kN, 16,500 lbf) dry and  11,200 kilograms force (110 kN, 24,700 lbf) with afterburner. This thrust enabled the Mikoyan-Gurevich MiG-25, with two engines, to reach mach 3.2, although the engines had to be scrapped after a flight to Mach 3.2. The engine had a very high fuel consumption, especially at low altitudes.

Variants
 R-15-300:  Original version. Used in Tupolev Tu-123 Yastreb drone.
 R-15-300M
 R-15B-300: Electronic engine controls (the first for the Soviet engine). and modifications to increase life span. Original engine for the MiG-25P, MiG-25R and variants.
 R-15BD-300: Improved and more powerful version for MiG-25PD and MiG-25PDS. Engine Lifespan increased up to 1000 Hours.
 R-15BF2-300: Uprated version. Used in Ye-266M high-performance MiG-25M prototype. MiG-25M aircraft was never put into production

Applications
 Mikoyan-Gurevich MiG-25
 Mikoyan-Gurevich Ye-150 family
 Tupolev Tu-121
 Tupolev Tu-123

Specifications (R-15B-300)

References

External links 

 R-15 on LeteckeMotory.cz (cs)
 R-15 on Airwar.ru (ru)

Tumansky aircraft engines
1950s turbojet engines